The 1828 United States presidential election in Virginia took place between October 31 and December 2, 1828, as part of the 1828 United States presidential election. Voters chose 24 representatives, or electors to the Electoral College, who voted for President and Vice President.

Virginia voted for the Democratic candidate, Andrew Jackson, over the National Republican candidate, incumbent President John Quincy Adams. Jackson won Virginia by a margin of 37.98%.

Results

References

Virginia
1828
1828 Virginia elections